Cevizli is a village in the Şavşat District, Artvin Province, Turkey. Its population is 440 (2021). The Tbeti Monastery is located in the center of the village.

References

Villages in Şavşat District